NGC 4320 is a peculiar galaxy located about 370 million light-years away in the constellation Virgo. It was discovered by astronomer Heinrich d'Arrest on April 15, 1865 and is a member of the NGC 4325 Group.

NGC 4320 appears to be the end result of an interaction and merger of two spiral galaxies.

See also
 List of NGC objects (4001–5000)
 Antennae Galaxies
 Mice Galaxies

References

External links

4320
040160
Virgo (constellation)
Astronomical objects discovered in 1865
Spiral galaxies
07452
Peculiar galaxies
Interacting galaxies